The Star Keys (Moriori: Motchu Hopo) are group of five rocky islets in the Chatham Archipelago, about  east of Pitt Island  They are called Motuhope in Moriori and Māori.

The largest of the Star Keys is Round Islet.

See also

 List of islands of New Zealand
 List of islands
 Desert island

References

Islands of the Chatham Islands
Uninhabited islands of New Zealand